The Portuguese Women's Handball Super Cup (Portuguese: Supertaça de Portugal de Andebol Feminino) is a Portuguese professional women's handball competition, played between the winners of the 1ª Divisão de Andebol Feminino and the winners of the Portuguese Cup (or the finalist, if the same team wins both competitions).

Winners

1983 : C.Ourique
1984 : Ass. Desp. Oeiras
1985-1987 : Not held
1988: Ginásio Sul
1989-1990 : Not held
1991 : Benfica
1992 : Colégio Gaia
1993 : Benfica (2)
1994 : Sports Madeira
1995 : União Almeirim
1996 : Sports Madeira (2)

1997 : Ac. Funchal
1998 : Colégio Gaia (2)
1999 : Madeira SAD
2000 : Madeira SAD (2)
2001 : Madeira SAD (3)
2002 : Madeira SAD (4)
2003 : Madeira SAD (5)
2004 : Madeira SAD (6)
2005 : Madeira SAD (7)
2006 : Madeira SAD (8)
2007 : Madeira SAD (9)

2008 : Madeira SAD (10)
2009 : Madeira SAD (11)
2010 : Madeira SAD (12)
2011 : Madeira SAD (13)
2012 : Madeira SAD (14)
2013 : Madeira SAD (15)
2014 : Madeira SAD (16)
2015 : Madeira SAD (17)
2016 : Madeira SAD (18)
2017 : Madeira SAD (19)
2018 : Madeira SAD (20)

Titles by club

References

Cup
1975 establishments in Portugal
Women's handball in Portugal
Women's sport in Portugal